Richard Max Ramin (November 22, 1929, Williamsport, Pennsylvania – May 27, 1995, Pittsburgh, Pennsylvania) was the Vice President for Public Affairs at Cornell University for twenty-four years and a member of the Cornell staff for forty-one.

Early life
Dick Ramin was the son of Richard and Florence Ramin. Dick started for his secondary school football team, the Williamsport High School Millionaires.  In 1946, he was named lineman for the Pennsylvania All-State Team.  While studying at Cornell, Ramin was a member of Sphinx Head and Delta Kappa Epsilon.  After graduating from Cornell in 1951, Dick served in the U.S. Army for two years as a First Lieutenant. He was then employed as a Cruise Director, Holland-American Steamship Lines.

Service on Cornell’s nationally ranked football team
While a Cornell undergraduate, Ramin was co-captain, with Rip Haley, of the freshman football team.  He started on the varsity football team during the 1948–50 seasons, when Cornell won two Ivy League titles.

University administrator
Ramin joined the Cornell university administration in 1954.  He served as Alumni Field Secretary. In 1956, he was promoted to Assistant Director of Admissions.  Serving in admissions until 1959, he was then appointed Associate Director of Development. In 1964, he was appointed Cornell’s Director of Development during the peak of the university’s post-World War Two expansion under James A. Perkins.  In this capacity, he was required to defend the university’s donor base through the awkward years following the Willard Straight Takeover.  In 1970, Dick was asked to take on the collateral duty of Assistant Vice President for Public Affairs during the six years of periodic student protest which followed the Willard Straight incident. Speaking of Ramin’s accomplishments as Director of Development, President Dale Corson said, “under Dick Ramin’s guidance, Cornell’s record in fund-raising has been unsurpassed by any educational institution in the United States.”

In 1971, President Corson elevated Ramin to the Vice President for Public Affairs.  In this new omnibus role, Ramin took charge of departments responsible for Alumni Affairs, Alumni Systems and Gift Services, University Development, the University Council, the Trust Office, Office of University Events, college and unit Public Affairs offices and a network of ten regional offices, including International Alumni Affairs. For the next twenty-four years, Dick served with distinction. During his tenure, the Cornell University Council and the university’s Regional Public Affairs Offices were established—two precedent-setting achievements— and three major capital campaigns took place.  Ramin excelled in fundraising to enhance of Cornell’s capital endowment.

Under Ramin’s early leadership, the Cornell Centennial Campaign was successfully completed at $73.2 million in 1965.  He then brought the 1980 Cornell Campaign to $250 million in donations. Ramin then spearheaded Cornell’s $1.25 billion Capital Campaign, begun in 1991 and successfully completed in 1995, just before his death.  “Cornell never had a more devoted alumnus, nor I a more steadfast friend, than Dick Ramin,” said President Rhodes. “He lived and breathed Cornell. He was a superb fund-raiser: his work will live on in the remarkable benefits that the present $1.25 billion campaign will contribute to the future strength of the university he loved so much.” .”  Robert V. Tishman  said “[h]e was creative, knowledgeable, and the results of what I have done [for Cornell] under his guidance are among the most rewarding I have experienced. Behind that easy country-boy approach was a very sharp mind.”

Family
In 1956, Dick Ramin and Frances Anthony of Penn Yan, New York were married.  Frances, a graduate of Keuka College, was then-employed in the Program Department of Willard Straight Hall.  In September 1960, the Ramins had their first child, Robert Anthony;  in 1963, their daughter, Nancy Alice, was born. Robert Ramin was married to Denise DeConcini in 1985, and they have two children, Margaret Alice and Daniel Anthony. Mrs. Denise (DeConcini) Ramin is the daughter of Dennis DeConcini, former United States Senator from the State of Arizona and Mrs. Susan (Hurley) DeConcini of Tucson, Arizona.  She took her medical degree from the George Washington University School of Medicine.  She took her bachelor’s degree from Cornell University, as did Robert Ramin, who also took his masters in business administration from Cornell's Graduate School of Management.  Nancy Ramin married Lawrence Dalton in 1987. They have a daughter, Christine Alice. Over the years, Dick Ramin enjoyed attending the children’s school functions, traveling, cooking Sunday morning brunches, boating, barbecuing at the cottage, playing with his grandchildren, winning at “The Poker Group,” listening to jazz, playing the boom bass, and relaxing with those he loved.

Education
Ramin took his bachelor's degree from Cornell’s College of Arts and Sciences with the class of 1951. Dick majored in political science. In 1968, he participated in the Graduate School of Business and Public Administration’s (B&PA) Executive Development Program in 1968.

Associations
Dick Ramin was a member of Delta Kappa Epsilon fraternity and the Sphinx Head honorary society.  Ramin was a member of the Board of Managers of Willard Straight Hall (1956–58) and a member of the Straight Board of Governors (1958–60). He was Delta Kappa Epsilon’s faculty advisor (1956–59) and a member of the university’s National Scholarship Committee during that same time. Ramin also was a member of the Cornell’s Administrative Systems Planning and Control Committee and a member of the American Alumni Council (AAC) and the American College Public Relations Association (ACPRA).  In the Ithaca community, Ramin was a member of the Tompkins County Chamber of Commerce, a deacon of the First Congregational Church, a member of the YMCA Board of Directors.  He was active in Explorer scouting and the United Way.

Harvey Sampson, a Ramin confidante of forty-eight years, remarked: “Dick was a very special person. He was modest and unassuming about his accomplishments, which were many and substantial. He was never boastful, nor did he do anything with fanfare or to promote himself. He always praised and gave credit to others.” And as former Cornell president Dale Corson summarized, “[Ramin] will be remembered fondly by those who worked for and with him, for his integrity, his kindness and compassion, his unswerving friendship, his gentle manner, the twinkle in his eye, and his pride in Cornell University and its potential.”

Death and legacy
Ramin died of pulmonary fibrosis.  At his Sage Chapel memorial service, June 18, 1995, the overflow of mourners attested to the words of President Frank H.T. Rhodes:

The multipurpose room in Cornell's Bartels Hall is named in his honor.

References

Cornell University alumni
Cornell University faculty
1929 births
1995 deaths
People from Williamsport, Pennsylvania